The Art Gallery of Sudbury is an art gallery in Greater Sudbury, Ontario, Canada.

Established in 1967 by the city's chamber of commerce under the Canadian Centennial projects, the gallery is located in the historic turn of the century arts and crafts movement Belrock Mansion of William J. Bell, an early lumber baron in the city and philanthropist. It was originally known as the Laurentian University Museum and Art Centre, or LUMAC, and adopted its current name in 1997.

Relocation and expansion plans

On October 27, 2010, the gallery announced that it will begin fundraising for and building a new  gallery building, to be named the Franklin Carmichael Gallery, with an initial target date of 2014.

As of 2018, the new facility is planned to be colocated with a new main branch of the Sudbury Public Library. Construction on the new facility is slated to begin in 2020, on the current site of the Sudbury Arena following the opening of a new larger arena in the city's east end.

References

External links
 

Art museums and galleries in Ontario
Museums in Greater Sudbury
1967 establishments in Ontario
Art museums established in 1967
Designated heritage properties in Ontario